"I Wanna Be a Kennedy" is a song recorded by German dance music project U96, released as the second single from their debut album, Das Boot. Musically, the song is very similar to the 1980 song "Fade to Grey" by British new wave band Visage, in which its similarity can be clearly heard in the main synthesizer riff. It was successful in Germany, Switzerland and Austria where it was a top ten hit.

Critical reception
British magazine Music Week gave the song four out of five, stating that U96 "could turn out to be more than one-hit-wonders thanks to I Wanna Be A Kennedy, a thumping rave track based on Visage's Fade To Grey. It all sounds a bit dated, but then so did Das Boot."

Track listings

 CD single, 12" maxi
 "I Wanna Be a Kennedy" (U.S. mix) — 5:25
 "I Wanna Be a Kennedy" (Patsy-mix) — 5:25
 "220 BPM" — 3:40

 12" maxi, CD single - Remixes
 "I Wanna Be a Kennedy" (Bio-Hazard mix) — 6:00
 "I Wanna Be a Kennedy" (Digi-Bone mix) — 5:25
 "No Control" — 4:30

 12" maxi - UK
 "I Wanna Be a Kennedy" (U.S. mix edit)
 "I Wanna Be a Kennedy" (Patsy mix)
 "I Wanna Be a Kennedy" (Bio-Hazard mix)
 "I Wanna Be a Kennedy" (Digi-Bone mix)

 12" maxi - Promo, Germany
 "I Wanna Be a Kennedy"
 "I Wanna Be A Kennedy" (untitled mix)
 "Is Patsy a Virgin?"

 CD single - UK
 "I Wanna Be a Kennedy" (7") — 3:22
 "I Wanna Be a Kennedy" (U.S. mix) — 5:33
 "I Wanna Be a Kennedy" (Patsy mix) — 5:25
 "I Wanna Be a Kennedy" (Bio-Hazard mix) — 6:01
 "I Wanna Be a Kennedy" (Digi-Bone mix) — 5:25

 Cassette, double length - UK
 "I Wanna Be a Kennedy" (7")
 "I Wanna Be a Kennedy" (Bio-Hazard edit)

Charts

Weekly charts

1 As B-side of "Das Boot"

Year-end charts

References

1992 singles
U96 songs
1992 songs
Polydor Records singles
Song recordings produced by Alex Christensen
Songs written by Alex Christensen
Techno songs